William Alexander Houston Collisson (20 May 1865 – 31 January 1920) was an Anglo-Irish priest, writer, organist, pianist, impresario, and composer, mainly remembered for his long collaboration with Percy French.

Life
Collisson was born in Dublin and graduated from Trinity College Dublin with degrees as Bachelor of Arts (BA, 1887) and Doctor of Music (MusD, 1891). He also received a Licentiate in Music (LMus) from Trinity College London. In 1899, he was ordained a priest at Truro Cathedral in Cornwall and subsequently served in different parishes in England.

He was appointed organist in a number of Anglican parishes in Ireland including St Patrick's Cathedral, Trim, County Meath (1882); St Paul's Church, Bray, County Wicklow (1884); in Rathfarnham, Dublin (1885–95); at the Church of the Holy Trinity, Rathmines, Dublin (1886); St Maelrune's, Tallaght, Dublin (1893); and St George's Church, Dublin (1885–98). He also sang in the choir of St Bartholomew's Church, Dublin (1893–96).

As a concert impresario, Collisson made a name for himself for organising, from 1887, increasingly popular "Saturday Concerts" in Belfast, Cork, Derry, Dublin, and London. In these, he often appeared himself variously as conductor, accompanist, and soloist. In Dublin in 1889, these also involved a choir of 100 voices and an orchestra. An attempt to invite Edvard Grieg in 1891 failed. In 1906–7, he also toured Ireland as a singer and performer on piano and organ in his own compositions. The experiences of these various travels were documented in anecdotal form in his book Dr. Collisson in and on Ireland (1908).

Collisson was involved, too, in establishing the Feis Ceoil with Annie Patterson, and he won competitions at the Feis Ceoil a number of times in several composers categories.

Music
As a composer, Collisson is remembered for his collaboration with the poet, writer, painter and composer Percy French (1854–1920), for whose poems he contributed numerous songs, the best-known one being The Mountains o' Mourne. They often appeared together on stage, including regular performances in London and touring North America in 1910. Collisson also wrote operas to which French contributed the libretto, including The Knight of the Road (1891) and Strongbow (1892).

Selected works

Stage works
 The Knight of the Road (libretto: Percy French), comic opera, 1891
 Strongbow, or The Bride of the Battlefield (P. French), comic opera, 1892
 Midsummer Madness (P. French), "musical comedietta", 1892
 The Irish Girl (P. French, B. Stewart), "comedy opera", 1918

Choral
 Mass in C major, c. 1890
 St Patrick, cantata (text: Annie W. Patterson), 1898
 Penzance, cantata, 1899
 The Game of Chess, cantata (text: A. W. Patterson), 1899
 Samhain, cantata (text: A. W. Patterson), 1901

Instrumental
 Three Light Pianoforte Pieces (not dated)
 Rosaleen, orchestral suite (Feis Ceoil Prize, 1903)

Songs
All to words by Percy French.

 When Erin Wakes, 1900
 Are ye right there, Michael?, 1902
 King Edward in Erin, 1903
 Maguire's Motor Bike, 1906
 Rafferty's Racin' Mare, 1906
 Wait for a while now, Mary, 1906
 Donnegan's Daughter, or The Beauty of Ballyporeen, 1908
 A Kerry Courting (song cycle), 1909
 Bad Ballads for Badish Babes (song cycle), 1910
 Tullinahaw, 1911
 The Mountains o' Mourne, 1920
 Eileen Oge, or The Pride of Petravore, published 1939

Writings
 Dr. Collisson in and on Ireland. A Diary of a Tour, with Personal Anecdotes, Notes Auto-Biographical and Impressions (London: Robert Sutton, 1908).

References

1865 births
1920 deaths
19th-century classical composers
19th-century Irish people
19th-century male musicians
19th-century musicians
20th-century classical composers
20th-century Irish people
20th-century male musicians
Alumni of Trinity College Dublin
Irish Anglicans
Irish classical composers
Irish opera composers
Irish organists
Irish songwriters
Male opera composers